The New York City Police Department Auxiliary Police is a volunteer reserve police force which is a subdivision of the Patrol Services Bureau of the New York City Police Department. Auxiliary Police Officers assist the NYPD with uniformed patrols, providing traffic control, crowd control, and other services during major events.

Over 4,500 Auxiliary Police officers contribute over one million hours of service each year. The NYPD Auxiliary Police program is the largest Auxiliary Police program in the United States.

Ranks 
There are seven titles (referred to as ranks) in the New York City Police Department Auxiliary Police:

History 
The precursors to the Auxiliary Police were organized primarily during times of war when police officers were drafted into service, leaving the city with a diminished police force.

The Home Defense League was established in New York City in 1916 under Police Commissioner Arthur Woods to supplement the police force. Many police officers had joined the armed forces as the war in Europe progressed. Citizens volunteered to enroll in the Home Defense League to aid police in patrolling duties and be on hand in case of emergencies. In a matter of months, 22,000 people had volunteered for the Home Defense League. They were required to attend trainings on handling prisoners, protecting themselves, and using weapons. They received no pay. If the need arose (as it did in 1917 when armed forces were mobilized), they could be called into service to guard armories, subway stations, and other areas of the city.

In 1918, the Home Defense League changed its name to the New York Reserve Police Force, as proposed by Commissioner Richard Enright, in addition to undergoing higher-caliber training under Special Deputy Police Commissioner Lewis Rodman Wanamaker. Over 3,000 women joined the Police Reserve, serving under Captain Mary Noonan, primarily to provide eyes and ears for the police, look out for children's safety, and give first aid if necessary. Governor Alfred E. Smith signed a new state law in 1920 that established the permanency of a reserve force as an adjunct of the police department. By the mid-1920s, however, the Police Reserve had gradually stopped functioning as an active part of the Police Department, due to political disputes in a high-crime period. The Reserve was formally disbanded in 1934.

During World War II, the need for a reserve force briefly returned. The City Patrol Corps was organized in 1942 to assist police in patrol work; over 4,500 men and women volunteered. By war's end in 1945, the corps was disbanded, but the city continued to maintain a volunteer police unit.

In 1950, the 81st Congress of the United States of America passed the Public Law #920, entitled "The Civil Defense Act of 1950," authorizing a Federal Civil Defense Program. In 1951, the New York State Legislature enacted the "Defense Emergency Act" requiring New York City to recruit, train, and equip volunteer Civil Defense wardens, who would provide traffic and crowd control and other assistance to police officers in the event of an emergency or natural disaster.

The New York Penal Law provided peace officer status for the Civil Defense wardens during the event of an actual natural or man-made disaster or attack or during training drills. In 1967, a Mayoral Executive Order closed the Civil Defense Headquarters and placed full responsibility of the Civil Defense wardens with the NYPD. The NYPD retitled the division Auxiliary Police, changed the uniform to reflect police officer uniforms, and revised the duties of Auxiliary Police. During the 1960s when crime was on the rise, uniformed Auxiliary Police patrols were one means to deter crime.

On March 20, 2020, the NYPD suspended the Auxiliary Police unit due to concerns regarding the COVID-19 pandemic.

Training and authority 

Auxiliary Police recruits must pass an 18-week, 140 hour "Auxiliary Police Basic Training Course".

Auxiliary recruits are required by the New York State Municipal Police Training Council to undergo and pass this training course before they become Auxiliary Police officers. The training given in this course includes training in penal law, police science, discipline, radio use, defensive tactics, unarmed self-defense, self-defense with a straight wood baton, physical training, chemical training, first aid, handcuffing techniques, and arrest procedures.

In 2008, the NYPD revised the training course to include training in location and use of pressure points, dealing with domestic violence situations, firearm safety, and terrorism awareness. A written and physical exam is given at the end of training.

Upon the completion of the Basic Training Course, the physical exam, and the written exam, probationary Auxiliary Police officers are issued their shield and police identification card along with their baton and initial uniform allowance voucher. Probationary Auxiliary Police officers must patrol with a field training officer.

All Auxiliary Police officers are required by New York State to pass an annual refresher course in the use of force with the straight baton, arrest procedures, and law in order to maintain their status.

Auxiliary Police officers are neither Police Officers nor Peace Officers (except during an emergency under 2.20 Criminal Procedure Law)

Although volunteers, Auxiliary Police officers are city employees while on duty and may be eligible for Workers' Compensation in the event of injury while on duty.

Auxiliary Police officers must purchase and maintain equipment at their own expense. Officers who work the minimum required hours per fiscal year receive an annual uniform allowance check to help pay for new and replacement equipment and uniforms.

Laws 

 Auxiliary Police officers may carry and use straight wood batons
 Auxiliary Police officers may carry and use handcuff (optional) restraints both on and off duty in accordance with NYC Administrative Code 10-147
 Auxiliary Police officers may physically detain violators of Misdemeanors and Felonies under the State of New York Civil Defense Act Article # 8 Section # 105
 Auxiliary Police officers injured while on duty are provided Workers Compensation under NYC Administrative Code Section 14-147 of chapter 1 of title 14
 Auxiliary Police officers receive an annual uniform allowance in accordance with the NYC Administrative Code Section 14-148
 Auxiliary Police officers can use physical and deadly force to make an arrest, or when a person uses physical or deadly force against an officer or a third person in accordance with the NYPD Auxiliary training manual.

Duties 

Auxiliary Police officers duties fall into four broad categories:
 Daily patrol of assigned sectors within their respective precinct, transit district, housing area or specialized unit coverage area.
 Provide additional uniform police presence at parks, playgrounds, pools, street fairs, flea markets, block parties, shopping areas, subway entrances and exits, and school/church crossings.
 Assist with vehicular and pedestrian traffic at parades, marathons, concerts, intersections with broken traffic lights, accident scenes, and fire scenes.
 Assist in Precinct Identification Programs, Combat Auto Theft Program, Bicycle ID Program, Operation ID Program, Kid Care Program, and VIN Etching Program.

Auxiliary Police officers increase the public's perception of police "omnipresence" by patrolling in police cars, on foot and on bicycle. The police cars, known in the NYPD as Radio Motor Patrols (or simply "RMPs"), are white with blue decals, the same as regular NYPD police cars. The word "AUXILIARY" is placed on the trunk, hood, and front and rear side panels of the vehicles with a red underline. Auxiliary Police Officers are equipped with straight wood batons when assigned to normal patrol, ASP batons (when assigned to bicycle patrol), bullet resistant vests, police radios directly linked to the Central Dispatcher, flashlights; whistles, handcuffs, notebooks, and reflective traffic vests.  With the exception of their badges, which are seven-point stars, in contrast to the shield worn by regular Police Officers, Auxiliary Police officers wear virtually the same uniform as regular officers. Additionally, Auxiliary Police Officers wear the regular NYPD patch on both shoulders with a scroll saying "AUXILIARY" on top.

Auxiliary Police officers in New York City are not permitted to carry a sidearm at any time on duty, even if independently licensed to carry a firearm. In other jurisdictions within New York State, some police departments do allow their Auxiliary Police Officers to carry a firearm.

Auxiliary Police Officers provide patrol presence, observations and reporting of incidents requiring regular police response. Auxiliary Police Officers may be involved in life or death situations like a full police officer but do not have the option of the use of a firearm.

Role of the Auxiliary Police officer 
Auxiliary Police officers can:
 Perform crowd control.
 Perform traffic control and effect street closures at parades, accidents, fires, etc. 
 Perform traffic control at broken traffic lights, accidents, etc.
 Make arrests for crimes committed in their presence or communicated over a police radio. 
 Give medical aid to anyone as long as they are trained to do so.
 Carry a police baton and ASP batons in the performance of their duties (NYS Penal Law 265.20 b.).
 Carry and use handcuff restraints in the performance of their duties (NYC Administrative Code 10-147).
 Make arrests for crimes not committed in their presence but only if ordered to do so by a regular police officer or a police dispatcher. In 1991, the New York State Court of Appeals determined that Auxiliary Police officers are covered under the "fellow officer rule", and therefore may detain a person based on information from a dispatcher or police officer heard over a police radio or from a police officer in person, and therefore are considered as a law enforcement officer with reliable information when making a report themselves to other law officers.

Auxiliary Police officers cannot:
 Respond to any 911 calls involving any type of weapons or other life endangering situation.

Standard Auxiliary Police units 
Precinct Patrol: Officers patrol their respective precinct. When performing foot patrol, the area of the precinct that the officer patrols is called a Patrol Area, which are divided into "Foot Posts". RMP and bike patrol are also performed. Officers under age 18 cannot perform patrol.

Housing Bureau: Officers patrol their respective Housing (Police Service Area) precinct, mainly being a uniformed presence within the NYC housing projects. When performing foot patrol, the area of the precinct that the officer patrols is called Patrol Areas, which are divided into "Foot Posts". RMP and bike patrol are also performed.

Transit Bureau: Officers patrol their respective Transit District precinct. When performing foot patrol, the area of the precinct that the officer patrols is called a Patrol Area, which are divided into "Foot Posts". RMP patrol is also performed.

Transit Auxiliary Police Officers 

Two weeks after the 2005 London bombings, a new directive stated that New York City would institute a citywide transit Auxiliary program with the intent of reducing crime and fighting terrorism in the city's transit system. Transit Auxiliary officers work out of Transit Bureau precincts known as Districts and carry Transit portable radios. Unlike a precinct, the transit districts cover miles of underground subway. Transit Auxiliary Police officers go through additional training by the Transit Bureau Vandals Squad as well as the Counter-Terrorism Division to build vandalism and terrorism awareness within the Transit System. Transit Auxiliary officers are paired with either a regular police officer or Auxiliary police officer. Transit Auxiliary Police periodically perform inspections of the subway station(s) and platforms which they are assigned to, taking note of any suspicious occurrences, and set up a fixed post at the subway turnstiles, token booths, mezzanines, or platforms. Transit Auxiliary officers also conduct subway train inspections as well as train runs to/from stations that which assignment is given. Due to the common medical emergency calls in Transit, if medically qualified, Transit Auxiliary Police officers can respond to medical emergencies if they are near to the transit location. The main function of the NYPD Transit Auxiliary Police, like the NYPD Transit Police, is to primarily remain within the subway system.

Specialized Auxiliary Police units 

Highway Patrol: Officers patrol highways, parkways, and main thoroughfares throughout the City of New York. Auxiliary Highway Patrol officers wear the same uniform as regular Highway Patrol officers and patrol in regular officers RMPs in Auxiliary Police Highway Patrol RMPs with AUXILIARY decals on each side. All applicants to this unit are required to have a minimum of five years experience as a patrol officer with the NYPD Auxiliary Police, must be mature, and have exceptional discipline and service records. Officers will be required to attend an Advanced Vehicle Operation Course before they may operate a Highway Patrol Vehicle. Auxiliary Officers aren't allowed to perform Traffic Stops. See article: New York City Police Department Highway Patrol

Harbor Unit: Officers patrol New York City's waterways. A marine background such as one obtained through the U.S. Coast Guard, military, or other marine background is required.

Citywide Traffic Task Force (CTTF): Officers patrol in areas all over the city that need special attention and extra patrol. However, more typical of this unit is performing duty during special events such as concerts, marathons, parades, etc. to increase the police presence. They are involved in both vehicular and pedestrian traffic control.  They do not confine themselves to one location or precinct.

Undercover Vice Ops: Officers that have not reached the age of 21 years old (18-20 1/2) can be utilized to assist the NYPD Vice Unit Narcotics Division for "Quality of Life enforcement" stings which address illegal alcohol, knife, and spray paint sales. Other than this exception, NYPD Auxiliary Police officers are never undercover (*unless authorized by the Police Commissioner or Commanding Officer of the Auxiliary Police) and always patrol in uniform. Officers who have received the necessary "Vice Training" may be used by their command in  surveillance operations.

Ceremonial Unit: The Auxiliary Police also has a ceremonial unit made up of a small group of Auxiliary officers.

Auxiliary Patrol and police vehicles 

Patrol is one of the most important duties Auxiliary officers can perform. Various types of patrols are possible within different precincts. Almost all precincts perform foot patrol. Other types of patrol include:

 RMP (Auxiliary Police Car) - cars are painted white with light blue decals.
 Van (15 passenger; Used for routine patrol and officer transport) -  vans are painted white with light blue decals.
 Bicycle
 Police Golf Cart (only used in Manhattan's Central Park Precinct)

In most cases, Auxiliary Police vehicles are retired vehicles that were once used by regular officers. Once the vehicle attains a certain amount of mileage, it is taken out of service and is either redecaled and given to a command for the Auxiliary Police, or is sold. Auxiliary Highway Patrol RMPs are retired RMPs previously used by regular Highway Patrol officers. Most commands only have one Auxiliary vehicle, but some have 2 or more. The number of Auxiliary vehicles per command is based on how many Auxiliary officers are working there and how many extra vehicles the NYPD has available. It should also be noted that older Auxiliary vehicles are painted either dark blue or black with white decals in contrast to the vehicles used by regular officers, which are white with light blue decals. In 2008, the NYPD changed the paint and decal color of Auxiliary vehicles to white with light blue decals in order to look like vehicles used by regular officers to assist with “Omni-Presence” and as an economy measure to save money by not having to repaint the vehicles.

Officers wishing to operate a bicycle, RMP, or van need special training before they are allowed to operate them. Training is done by the Police Academy Driver Training Unit (PADT) which is located at Floyd Bennett Field in Brooklyn. The golf cart, which is special to the Central Park Precinct, also requires special training to operate.

Equipment 
Auxiliary Police officers are not issued, and are not permitted to carry firearms while on duty, even if otherwise authorized/licensed to carry when off-duty.

Risks are involved and seven officers have been killed in the line of duty. On March 14, 2007, two Auxiliary Police officers—Eugene Marshalik and Nicholas Pekearo—were killed in a shootout in Greenwich Village.

Up until March 26, 2007, the NYPD did not issue or subsidize ballistic vests to Auxiliary officers. But after the shootings of Pekearo and Marshalik, Mayor Michael R. Bloomberg and Commissioner Raymond W. Kelly asked the New York City Council to earmark more than 3.3 million dollars to provide all Auxiliary Police officers with Level IIIA Vests, the same used by full-time officers. On March 27, 2007, the City Council approved this bill, which had all Auxiliary officers equipped with vests. Since then, in 2010, funding for vest for Auxiliary Police Officers has run out of the NYPD City Budget. Every Police Precinct, Housing Police Service Area and Transit District has a pool of "loaner" vest for new Auxiliary Police Officers to use while on patrol. Afterwards, they are returned and secured by the Auxiliary Coordinator.

Representation 
New York City Auxiliary Police Officers of all ranks have been represented since 1965 by the Auxiliary Police Benevolent Association of the City of New York (APBA). While Auxiliary Police Officers are not full-time employees of the NYPD, they face many of the issues regular Police Officers face regarding working conditions, including safety, disciplinary actions, and uniform allowance reimbursement. Membership is voluntary.

Line-of-duty deaths 

Since the establishment of the New York City Police Department Auxiliary Police, seven officers have died in the line of duty.

Controversy 

 Currently, there is major controversy over benefits afforded to Auxiliary Police Officers. Under New York law stated above, Auxiliary Police are trained "peace officers", but do not have on- or off-duty status. In 2008, the federal government denied death benefits for the families of Auxiliary Police Officer's Eugene Marshalik and Nicholas Pekearo, who were killed in the line of duty, due to their lack of peace officer status when they were killed. After an appeal, the federal government reversed their decision and approved their death benefits.
 In January 2018, a former NYPD Auxiliary Police Officer began a lawsuit against the department and the Auxiliary Police Section in particular, for not adequately nor professionally processing her allegations of sexual harassment on two of her supervisors out of the Queens police precinct she worked out of. Her allegations, written into a formal complaint to the Division of Human Rights, said that on the night of August 22, 2017, her Coordinator (Police Officer Andrew Thaler) and one of her Auxiliary Police Supervisors (A/Sergeant Rohnit Singh) texted her following her regular tour of duty that night. They allegedly proceeded to insist, against departmental policy, to ask her to get off of her local bus early and meet them a block back in the direction of their station house. Upon arrival, the former APO claimed that she was molested by Officer Thaler and that her patrol supervisor, Auxiliary Sergeant Singh, stood by in the front of the NYPD vehicle they were in. After noticing that she wasn't interested, Officer Thaler had her dropped back off at the bus stop and returned to their assigned duties. Following a formal complaint to the NYPD regarding the incident, she was removed from the Auxiliary Police and given the reason that she broke departmental policy by entering the vehicle, knowing fully that it was in violation of said policies. As of April 2018, she is still fighting the department and the Auxiliary Police Section.

Awards and decorations

Medal of Honor 

(Solid green bar speckled tiny gold stars) is awarded for:
Individual acts of extraordinary bravery intelligently performed in the line of duty at imminent and personal danger to life. Specifically, the Department Medal of Honor is awarded for acts of gallantry and valor performed with knowledge of the risk involved, above and beyond the call of duty. The Medal of Honor is intended only for regular Police Officers. It was awarded posthumously to Marshalik and Peakaro due to the extraordinary circumstances of their line of duty deaths. The Award of Valor is normally the highest decoration for bravery given to Auxiliary Police Officers.

American Flag Breast Bar

May be worn by all Auxiliary Police Officers in the Auxiliary Unit

World Trade Center Breast Bar 

May be worn by all members who were in the Auxiliary Police on 9/11/2001.

Award of Valor 

May be worn by all members who have received the Award of Valor.

Award of Commendation 

May be worn by all Auxiliary officers who have received the Award of Commendation.

Award of Merit 

May be worn by all members who have received the Award of Merit.

Unit Citation 

May be worn by all members of the unit in the year citation was earned.

Community Service Award (3000 Hours) 

May be worn by all members who have 3000 hours of service in the Auxiliary Police.

500 Hours Award 

May be worn by all members who have 500 hours of service in the Auxiliary Police.

Auxiliary Police 50th Anniversary 

May be worn by all members who were in the Auxiliary Police in 2000.

See also 

 New York City Police Department
 New York City Police Department Highway Patrol
 List of law enforcement agencies in New York
 Law enforcement in New York City
 New York City Police Department Cadet Corps
 Color of the day (police)

References

External links 
 Official website of the NYPD Auxiliary Police
 Official website of the NYPD
 Auxiliary Police Supervisors Benevolent Association
 Auxiliary Police Benevolent Association
 New York State Association of Auxiliary Police
 Drilling the Women Police Reserve for an Emergency, photo in the 1918 New York City Police Department Annual Report, held at John Jay College of Criminal Justice, Lloyd Sealy Library Special Collections
 A company of the Home Defense League drilling on roof of a down-town sky-scraper, photo in the 1916 New York City Police Department Annual Report, held at John Jay College of Criminal Justice, Lloyd Sealy Library Special Collections

Auxiliary Police
Auxiliary police units
Law enforcement agencies of New York City